Rixeyville is an unincorporated community in Culpeper County, Virginia, United States. Rixeyville has a post office with ZIP code 22737, which opened on February 16, 1818.

The Rixey family owned plantations in the area before the American Civil War. U.S. Congressman John Franklin Rixey represented Virginia's 8th Congressional district for a decade (1897-1907).

References

Unincorporated communities in Culpeper County, Virginia
Unincorporated communities in Virginia